Succussion may refer to:
Succussion a homeopathy preparation procedure
Succussion splash